{| 
 

{{Infobox ship career
|Hide header=title
|Ship name= Pentridge Hill
|Ship namesake= Pentridge Hill, Dorset
|Ship owner= Dorset Steam Ship Company
|Ship operator= Counties Ship Management
|Ship acquired= 1936
|Ship in service=
|Ship registry=  London
|Ship identification=*Call sign GQTZ (from 1934)

UK Official Number 137842
|Ship out of service= 1939
|Ship fate= Sold
|Ship notes= 
}}

|}

SS Lambridge was a  UK cargo ship that was built in 1917, gave 28 years of service and was scuttled in 1945. She was launched as Glennevis but changed owners and names a number of times, successively becoming African Prince, Pentridge Hill, Botlea, HMS Lambridge and Lambridge. She was scuttled as part of a programme to dispose of UK stocks of chemical weapons.

Building
The Ayrshire Dockyard Company Ltd. built the ship to the UK Shipping Controller's standard "B" type cargo ship design. The boilers fed a Dunsmuir and Jackson three-cylinder 510 NHP triple expansion steam engine that drove a single screw propeller.

Names and owners
The ship was launched in 1917 as Glennevis for the Western Steam Ship Company of Glasgow. In 1922 she was sold to Furness Withy who renamed her African Prince. In 1936 she was sold to the Dorset Steamship Company, which renamed her Pentridge Hill. Dorset SS Co was a London-based company controlled by Counties Ship Management.

In 1939 she was sold to Sir Wm. Reardon Smith & Sons, Ltd, who renamed her Botlea. In September and October 1939 she became one of nine merchant ships that the Admiralty acquired to convert into Q-ships. Botlea was commissioned into the Royal Navy as HMS Lambridge with the pennant number X15. The Q-ships were not successful and from February 1941 she served as the armed merchant cruiser Lambridge.

Scuttling
After the Second World War the Admiralty used her to dispose of redundant chemical ammunition.

References

1917 ships
Ships built on the River Clyde
Scuttled vessels of the United Kingdom
Ships of Counties Ship Management
Steamships of the United Kingdom
World War I merchant ships of the United Kingdom
World War II shipwrecks in the Atlantic Ocean
Maritime incidents in December 1945